Ilian Dimitrov (born 22 February 1953) is a Bulgarian boxer. He competed in the men's middleweight event at the 1976 Summer Olympics. At the 1976 Summer Olympics, he lost to Rufat Riskiyev of the Soviet Union.

References

1953 births
Living people
Bulgarian male boxers
Olympic boxers of Bulgaria
Boxers at the 1976 Summer Olympics
Place of birth missing (living people)
Middleweight boxers